The Plains Conservation Center is an outdoor education center and state-designated natural area in Aurora, Colorado. The Aurora property is owned by the Aurora Parks, Recreation and Open Space department.

History
The land that is currently part of the Aurora site was once part of the railroad. The city of Denver bought the land in 1933, and the land later became federal land managed by the Bureau of Land Management. An education center was established in 1949, and in 1969 a group of sod structures were built. The Plains Conservation Center non-profit dissolved and the City of Aurora, already owning the land, assumed management of the site in 2017.

Activities
The Aurora site features a replica homestead village that includes two houses, a school house, blacksmith shop and chicken coop, a replica tipi camp, and 1,000 acres of shortgrass prairie. Special seasonal events and education programs are offered through the City of Aurora's naturalist program and the Denver Botanic Gardens.

Gallery

References

Further reading

External links

 Plains Conservation Center

Nature centers in Colorado
Open-air museums in Colorado
Museums in Arapahoe County, Colorado
Protected areas of Arapahoe County, Colorado
Education in Arapahoe County, Colorado